Tianba is a town in the Garzê Tibetan Autonomous Prefecture of Sichuan, China. It has a monsoon-influenced humid subtropical climate under the Köppen climate classification.

See also 
 List of township-level divisions of Sichuan

References 

Populated places in the Garzê Tibetan Autonomous Prefecture
Towns in Sichuan